Vladimir Nikolayevich Voltchkov (Uładzimir Mikałajevič Vałčkoŭ; ; born April 7, 1978) is a Belarusian former professional tennis player. Voltchkov reached the semifinals at the 2000 Wimbledon Championships, where, as a qualifier, he lost to Pete Sampras in straight sets. He represented Belarus in both the Davis Cup and the Olympic Games in 2000, also won the Wimbledon juniors competition in 1996. His career-high singles ranking is world No. 25.

Tennis career

Juniors
Voltchkov had excellent results as a junior capturing the Wimbledon juniors title defeating Ivan Ljubičić in 1996. He compiled a singles win–loss record of 69–34, reaching as high as No. 7 in the world in 1996.

Junior Grand Slam results:

Australian Open: –
French Open: 3R (1996)
Wimbledon: W (1996)
US Open: 3R (1995, 1996)

Pro tour
His highest achievement came in 2000, inspired by the film Gladiator.  After watching the movie four times, he went on to reach the semifinals of the Wimbledon Championships as a qualifier, causing the British press to dub him "The Vladiator". En route to the semifinals he beat Juan Ignacio Chela, Cédric Pioline, Younes El Aynaoui, Wayne Ferreira and Byron Black before losing to eventual champion Pete Sampras. Voltchkov has a 30–16 career Davis Cup record (17–11 in singles).

Junior Grand Slam finals

Singles: 1 (1 title)

ATP career finals

Singles: 1 (1 runner-up)

Doubles: 1 (1 title)

ATP Challenger and ITF Futures finals

Singles: 15 (13–2)

Doubles: 12 (11–1)

Performance Timeline

Singles

References

External links
 
 
 

1978 births
Living people
Belarusian male tennis players
Olympic tennis players of Belarus
Tennis players from Minsk
Tennis players at the 2000 Summer Olympics
Wimbledon junior champions
Grand Slam (tennis) champions in boys' singles